Craib is a surname. Notable people with the surname include:

Ian Craib (1945–2002), British sociologist and psychotherapist
James Craib (1917–1994), English cricketer
Mark Craib (born 1970), Scottish footballer
William Grant Craib (1882–1933), British botanist